Rebordainhos is a village and head of civil parish Rebordainhos e Pombares in the municipality of Bragança, Portugal.

History

The village of Rebordainhos was, until the 19th century, head of a municipality (concelho) with the same name, constituted only by Rebordainhos and another small village called Vilar D’ouro.

References

Former parishes of Bragança, Portugal